Indonesia has the sixth-largest exclusive economic zone (ZEE) in the world with . It claims an EEZ of 200 nautical miles (370 km) from its shores. This is due to the 13,466 islands of the Indonesian archipelago. It has the 3rd largest coastline of 54,720 km (34,000 mi). It is located in Southeast Asia between the Indian Ocean and the Pacific Ocean.

Geography
Indonesia is the largest island country in the world. The total land and sea area (including the EEZ) of Indonesia is about 7.9 million km2.

The five main islands are: Sumatra, Java, Borneo, Sulawesi, and Western New Guinea. There are two major island groups (Nusa Tenggara and the Maluku Islands) and sixty smaller island groups. Borneo is shared with Malaysia and Brunei; Sebatik (located northeast of Borneo) is shared with Malaysia; Timor is shared with East Timor; and New Guinea is shared with Papua New Guinea (east side).

Disputes 

Parts of China's Nine-Dash Line overlap Indonesia's exclusive economic zone near the Natuna islands. Indonesia believes China's claim over parts of the Natuna islands has no legal basis. In November 2015, Indonesia's security chief Luhut Panjaitan said Indonesia could take China before an international court if Beijing's claim to the majority of the South China Sea and part of Indonesian territory is not resolved through dialogue.

The Philippines, Vietnam, Malaysia, Brunei and Indonesia have all officially protested over the use of such a line.

On 26 May 2020, Indonesia sent a formal letter to the United Nations which said "Indonesia reiterates that the Nine-Dash line map implying historic rights claim clearly lacks international legal basis and is tantamount to upsetting UNCLOS 1982," “As a State Party to UNCLOS 1982, Indonesia has consistently called for the full compliance toward international law, including UNCLOS 1982. Indonesia hereby declares that it is not bound by any claims made in contravention to international law, including UNCLOS 1982,"

See also 
 Exclusive economic zone of India
 Exclusive economic zone of Malaysia
 Exclusive economic zone of Thailand
 Sabang strategic port development
 Territorial waters of Indonesia

References 

Indonesia
Borders of Indonesia
Economy of Indonesia
China–Indonesia relations